Palasport di San Siro was an indoor arena in Milan, Italy. It was primarily used for basketball and volleyball until the PalaSharp opened in 1985.  The arena held 18,000 spectators and opened on 31 January 1976.  On January 17, 1985, a large snowfall collapsed the roof and the arena was closed. 

On 14 and 15 September 1984, at Palasport di San Siro, British rock band Queen made their only own two concerts (besides the 1984 Sanremo Music Festival) in Italy with Freddie Mercury as frontman.

References

Defunct indoor arenas
Defunct basketball venues
Defunct sports venues in Italy
Indoor track and field venues
Sports venues in Milan